Xinqiao (Shanghainese: sin1jiau1; literally "new bridge") is a town of Songjiang District in the southwestern suburbs of Shanghai. , it has 13 residential communities (社区) under its administration. It is served by Xinqiao railway station, on the Jinshan railway, and located just east of the intersection of G15 Shenyang–Haikou Expressway and G60 Shanghai–Kunming Expressway.

See also 
 List of township-level divisions of Shanghai

References 

Towns in Shanghai
Songjiang District